is a Japanese video game composer and bass guitarist. His most notable works include the soundtracks to the Shadow Hearts series. Hirota was previously a sound effects programmer having worked on various Square titles. His first work as a video game composer was for the 1999 Nintendo 64 game Bomberman 64: The Second Attack.

Biography

Early works
As a teenager, Hirota's older brother would play covers of The Beatles and The Carpenters. Hirota composed his first song at the age of ten. At the age of 20, unsure of his career path, Hirota was invited by composer Yasunori Mitsuda to work at Square, and was hired as a sound designer.

Square
Hirota has a friendship from childhood with fellow composer Yasunori Mitsuda who he has worked with on Bomberman 64: The Second Attack, Biohazard 2 Drama Albums, Shadow Hearts and Shadow Hearts II. Under the direction of Mitsuda, Street Fighter Alpha 3 was to have a "hard" sound, and Biohazard 2 was to have an "ominous sound".

Shadow Hearts
Kyoko Kishikawa has worked with Hirota on Shadow Hearts, Shadow Hearts II (although not Shadow Hearts: From the New World) and Rogue Galaxy Premium Arrange, providing eerie female scat vocals for a number of his tracks. Ryo Fukuda has been the sound manipulator for Hirota on the Shadow Hearts games as well as composing and arranging a few tracks for all three games. He also co-composed with Hirota on Sonic Shuffle. Kenji Ito worked with Hirota on the soundtrack of Shadow Hearts II.

Live performance
Hirota has performed bass guitar for Ito's live performance of Culdcept music during the Extra Live Concert. and for Ito's vocal song for Lux-Pain, Hirota frequently performs bass guitar with Kishikawa's band. He is currently a member of Nobuo Uematsu's band, the Earthbound Papas.

Musical style and influences
Hirota's Shadow Hearts music is notable for its fusion of cultural music with Hirota's personal Industrial style. Although Hirota is primarily a bass guitarist, he is capable of playing a variety of other instruments: the Biwa, the Syami, the Alter Ego Figaro, the Saw Wo, the Son, the Khene, the Old Drum, the Madaru, the Gong, the Suzu, and the Kalimba.

Works

Video games
Composition

Sound design

Other works

References

External links
 Official website

1971 births
Freelance musicians
Japanese composers
Japanese male composers
Living people
Musicians from Kyoto Prefecture
Video game composers